Garnudden Nature Reserve is a nature reserve in Salem Municipality, Stockholm County in Sweden.

The purpose of the nature reserve is to protect the natural values of the area for the future, as it is located close to an urban environment, as well as an effort to sustain the biodiversity of the area. The area is topographically varied and is typical for forest areas on Södertörn. Several protected species are known from the area, including Phellinus pini and Cortinarius sulfurinus.

The area is accessible to visitors via footpaths. A beach for bathing also lies within the reserve and is supervised by Salem Municipality.

References

Nature reserves in Sweden
Geography of Stockholm County
Tourist attractions in Stockholm County
Protected areas established in 2010
2010 establishments in Sweden